William Kellock (born 7 February 1954) is a Scottish former footballer who scored 77 goals in 298 league games in an 11-year career in the Football League in the 1970s and 1980s. He played for Aston Villa, Cardiff City, Norwich City, Millwall, Chelmsford City, Kettering Town, Peterborough United, Luton Town, Wolverhampton Wanderers, Southend United, Port Vale, and Halifax Town. He was twice named on the PFA Team of the Year and was promoted out of the Second Division with Wolves in 1982–83.

Career
Kellock was a youth-team player at Aston Villa, though went on to play for Cardiff City in the 1971 FA Youth Cup final defeat to Arsenal. He broke into the first team during the 1971–72 and 1972–73 seasons, helping Jimmy Scoular's "Bluebirds" to 19th and 20th-place finishes in the Second Division. He scored two goals in 35 league games at Ninian Park. He then played three First Division games for Norwich City in 1973–74 as John Bond's "Canaries" suffered relegation. He left Carrow Road to sign with Millwall, who were themselves relegated out of the Second Division in 1974–75. However "Lions" manager Gordon Jago never handed Kellock his league debut, who left The Den and dropped out of the Football League and joined Chelmsford City. The "Clarets" finished 14th in the Southern League in 1975–76, and Kellock switched to Kettering Town. Manager Derek Dougan led the "Poppies" to third in the Southern League 1976–77, and then new boss Mick Jones led the club to sixth place in 1977–78.

Kellock impressed at Rockingham Road, and returned to the Football League with Peterborough United. Peter Morris's "Posh" finished eighth in the Fourth Division in 1979–80, before posting a fifth-place finish in 1980–81 – they ended the campaign just one place and three points behind promoted Wimbledon. They finished fifth again in 1981–82, six points behind fourth placed Bournemouth. In both 1980–81 and 1981–82, Kellock was named on the PFA Team of the Year. He scored 43 goals in 134 league games at London Road. He then played seven league games for David Pleat's Luton Town, but quickly left Kenilworth Road to play for Graham Hawkins's Wolverhampton Wanderers. Wolves were promoted out of the Second Division in second place in 1982–83. Kellock scored three goals in 12 league games at Molineux.

He was re-signed by Peter Morris, now manager at Southend United, who were relegated out of the Third Division in 1983–84. Kellock scored eight goals in 53 league games at Roots Hall. He joined John Rudge's Port Vale in December 1984. He had a "stunning impact" on his debut; scoring two goals in a 5–1 win over Exeter City at Vale Park on New Year's Day. He was a regular in the side, scoring four goals in 11 Fourth Division games in 1984–85, before he strained a hamstring in March. After refusing new terms in June 1985 he signed for Halifax Town, who were managed his former boss Mick Jones. He went on to score 17 goals in 43 Fourth Division appearances for the "Shaymen" in 1985–86, but then left The Shay to make a return to Kettering Town, who were then in the Conference.

Post-retirement
After leaving the game, Kellock was head of sales and marketing at a Country club near Oakham.

Career statistics
Source:

Honours
Individual
Football League Fourth Division PFA Team of the Year: 1980–81 & 1981–82

Cardiff City
FA Youth Cup runner-up: 1971

Wolverhampton Wanderers
Football League Second Division second-place promotion: 1982–83

References

Footballers from Glasgow
Scottish footballers
Association football midfielders
Aston Villa F.C. players
Cardiff City F.C. players
Norwich City F.C. players
Millwall F.C. players
Chelmsford City F.C. players
Kettering Town F.C. players
Peterborough United F.C. players
Luton Town F.C. players
Wolverhampton Wanderers F.C. players
Southend United F.C. players
Port Vale F.C. players
Halifax Town A.F.C. players
English Football League players
Southern Football League players
National League (English football) players
1954 births
Living people